Angry Video Game Nerd (abbreviated as AVGN) is an American web series of comedy-themed retrogaming reviews, created by and starring James Rolfe. The show revolves around reviews that involve acerbic rants about low quality video games. From the beginning of season 2, new episodes were aired first on GameTrailers.com, but are since now aired at Cinemassacre.com, with episodes later being re-aired on Rolfe's own YouTube channel. Episodes are usually scheduled for release on the first or second Wednesday of each month; originally, Rolfe's early work schedule allowed for two episodes per month, but other work commitments changed this to its present arrangement.

The only AVGN episode, although still available for viewing, that never officially made it to/remained on YouTube was Atari Porn, which was removed after the site flagged it for inappropriate content per its community guidelines. The two part review of Teenage Mutant Ninja Turtles 3 was removed for copyright issues, however an edited version was reuploaded in 2020 as one video. Two other episodes were later removed for using movie clips from copyrighted films – Rocky and Super Mario Bros. 3 – but were later reuploaded to YouTube after being amended and changed to comply with the website's policies.

Series overview

Episodes

Season 1 (2004–06)

Season 2 (2007–08)

Season 3 (2008–09)
{{Episode table 
|background=#6ACF29
|overall=6
|season=6
|title=68
|aux2=
|aux2T=Time
|airdate=20
|episodes=

{{Episode list
 |EpisodeNumber   = 52
 |EpisodeNumber2  = 11
 |Title           = Batman Part I
 |Aux2            = 11:45
 |OriginalAirDate =   (GameTrailers)  
  (YouTube) 
 |ShortSummary    = Part 1 of 2. The Nerd dons his cowl and cape and prepares to beat back the darkness of bad Batman video games, including Batman: The Caped Crusader (Commodore 64), Batman (NES), Batman Returns (Sega CD and Atari Lynx), The Adventures of Batman & Robin (SNES), and Batman Forever (SNES). After the Nerd calls it quits, the Joker ties him up and forces him to play more Batman games. 
Guest Star: Mike Matei as the JokerNotes: The opening sequence for these episodes was specially themed around a parody of the 60s Batman TV series opening, and was animated by Matei. These episodes were made to commemorate the release of The Dark Knight.
 |LineColor       = 6ACF29
}}

}}

Season 4 (2009–10)

Season 5 (2010–11)

Season 6 (2011)

Season 7 (2012–13)
Starting with this season, episodes no longer aired on GameTrailers

Season 8 (2014)
Episodes 5 to 16 were released as part of the "12 Days of Shitsmas" event in December 2014.

Angry Video Game Nerd: The Movie (2014)

At the end of the Spielberg Games review, it was implied that E.T. would be reviewed in The Angry Video Game Nerd: The Movie. Eventually, at TooManyGames 2011 and Magfest 2012, Rolfe confirmed that he would review E.T. in the film. E.T. programmer, Howard Scott Warshaw, also makes an appearance in the film. The film premiered July 21, 2014.

Season 9 (2015)

Season 10 (2016)

Season 11 (2017)

Season 12 (2018)

Season 13 (2019)

Season 14 (2020)

Season 15 (2021)

Season 16 (2022)

Season 17 (2023)

Related videos
Cinemassacre
The following collection of videos features appearances by either James Rolfe, or his character The Nerd:

ScrewAttack
The following collection of videos features appearances by either James Rolfe, or his character The Nerd:

Channel Awesome
The following collection of videos features appearances by either James Rolfe, or his character The Nerd. This includes Channel Awesome's collection of videos from the special crossover series between Angry Video Game Nerd and Nostalgia Critic'':

Cinevore Studios/Mixed Nuts Productions
The following collection of videos feature appearances by James Rolfe's character, the Nerd:

GameTrailers
The following collection of videos features appearances by either James Rolfe, or his character The Nerd:

Pat the NES Punk
The following collection of videos features appearances by either James Rolfe, or his character The Nerd:

Other
The following collection of videos features appearances by either James Rolfe, or his character The Nerd:

Clip Collection videos

Bad Game Cover Art
In 2015, from December 1 to 25, a series of mini episodes was released in the style of an advent calendar, in which the Nerd comments on poor examples of video game cover art. The following list these episodes:

#shorts
YouTube Shorts featuring the Angry Video Game Nerd.

Home releases
These DVDs and Blu-rays have not been sold in stores, with the exception of the ScrewAttack store.

References

External links
AVGN Full Episode List at Cinemassacre Productions

Cinemassacre
Angry Video Game Nerd, the
Angry Video Nerd, The